Good Friday is the fourth studio album by The Easybeats, released in May 1967. It was the first album released after the band signed an international recording deal with United Artists Records. The original UK album was released in May 1967.  Although "Friday on My Mind" was a big single in the UK, the album failed to make the top 40.

History

In August 1966, the band relocated from Australia to London after being signed to United Artists Records.  Their first recordings in England was to deliver a single to United Artists, using their long-time producer and head of their production company, Ted Albert.  The band recorded a number of songs with Ted Albert at EMI's Abbey Road Studios which included "Baby, I'm Coming" and "Mandy".  However these were rejected by United Artists and Albert was removed as producer and replaced with freelance producer Shel Talmy, who had achieved great success with his production for the Who and the Kinks (both "Baby, I'm Coming" and "Mandy" would be later released in Australia on The Shame Just Drained and Son of Easyfever successively). United Artists also felt that the band's song writing was too "unsophisticated" for the competitive UK market. The label had already released the Wright/Young composition "Come And See Her" as a single in the UK on 15 July that same year and it had not sold well. Dutch-born Vanda, now having a stronger grasp of English, replaced Wright as Young's song writing partner at this point.

After auditioning several titles for Talmy, "Friday on My Mind" caught the producer's ear as the next single. The band recorded the song with Talmy at IBC Studios, London in September. "Friday on My Mind" was released in the UK on 14 October 1966. It reached #6 on the UK Charts making it the group's first big international hit. The song charted in multiple countries: No. 1 in Australia, No. 13 in Canada, No. 16 in the US, and the Top 10 in Germany, the Netherlands and France, and sold over one million copies worldwide. It was awarded a gold disc.

After the success of "Friday", recording began with Talmy on the follow-up single.  "Happy Is The Man", "All Gone Boy", "You Me We Love" were early contenders, but it was "Who'll Be The One" that was ultimately chosen.  Recording on the album would continue throughout March 1967. The single for "Who'll Be The One" was released as a single in April while the band was tour with The Rolling Stones in Europe.  It was not as successful in the UK charts as "Friday On Mind" but reached #14 on the Australian charts.

Release

United Artists Records released Good Friday in May 1967, with its US counterpart Friday On My Mind being released the same month.

Due to contractual issues, there was no official release of Good Friday in the band's home country of Australia at the time of its release.  The songs "Friday on My Mind", "Made My Bed, Gonna Lie in It" and "Pretty Girl" were released on the greatest hits package The Best of The Easybeats + Pretty Girl (released to cash-in on the band's 1967 homecoming tour), while other left over songs would appear on various EP's.  The US Friday On My Mind album would eventually be released on the budget World Record Club label in 1969.

The UK version was later reissued by Repertoire Records (but re-titled Friday on My Mind like the US release) and featured twelve bonus tracks.

On April 16, 2016, the mono version of the album was re-released on vinyl by Varèse Sarabande as an exclusive for Record Store Day.

Track listing
All songs written by Harry Vanda and George Young except as noted.

The North American release – Friday on My Mind

see: main article

The North American version was re-titled Friday On My Mind and also issued in the same month  with a different album cover and running order from the UK release. This version omitted "Hound Dog" and replaced it with "Women" (re-titled "Make You Feel Alright (Women)") from the It's 2 Easy album.  The US version has never appeared on CD.

Personnel
The Easybeats
Stevie Wright – vocals
Harry Vanda – vocals, lead guitar
George Young – vocals, rhythm guitar
Dick Diamonde – bass guitar
Snowy Fleet – drums
Production Team
Shel Talmy – producer
Glyn Johns – engineer

References

External links
[ allmusic – Friday on My Mind]
– Friday on My Mind CD

The Easybeats albums
1967 albums
Albums produced by Shel Talmy
United Artists Records albums
Albums recorded at IBC Studios
Albums recorded at Olympic Sound Studios